Henry Harcourt  (20 September 1873 – 20 February 1933) was a British barrister, Indian civil servant and Liberal Party politician.

Background
Harcourt was the son of R.F. and Caroline Harcourt. He was educated at Merchant Taylors' school, London and Pembroke College, Oxford (Scholar) where in 1894 he obtained a 2nd class Honour Moderations and in 1896 a 2nd class in Literae Humaniores. He married Emma Newton who died in 1907. He then married Elsie Mary Knight. They had two sons and three daughters. In 1919 he was made a Commander of the Order of the British Empire.

Professional career
In 1896 Harcourt joined the Indian Civil Service, serving in India from 1897 to 1923. He was District Judge, in Delhi, 1904–06 and Deputy Commissioner, in Rohtak, 1914–19. He was a Captain in the Indian Defence Force, Voluntary Division. In 1920 he received a call to the bar and joined the South East Circuit. In 1924, his work Sidelights on the Crisis in India was published.

Political career

Harcourt was Progressive candidate for the South division of Poplar at the 1928 London County Council Election. 
He was Liberal candidate for the North West division of Camberwell at the 1929 General Election. 

He did not stand for parliament again.

References

1873 births
1933 deaths
Liberal Party (UK) parliamentary candidates
Progressive Party (London) politicians
Alumni of Pembroke College, Oxford
Indian Civil Service (British India) officers
Commanders of the Order of the British Empire
British people in colonial India